The following lists events that happened during 1983 in Sri Lanka.

Incumbents
 President – J. R. Jayewardene
 Prime Minister – Ranasinghe Premadasa
 Chief Justice – Neville Samarakoon

Events
 Following the ambush of a Sri Lankan Army military patrol, the Black July riots begin claiming the lives of over 1000 ethnic Tamils. roughly 150,000 people were homeless with many businesses burnt.
 The 2 decade long Sri Lankan Civil War begins on 23 July following ethnic tensions between the Tamil minority and the Sinhalese majority.

Notes

a.  Gunaratna, Rohan. (1998). Pg.353, Sri Lanka's Ethnic Crisis and National Security, Colombo: South Asian Network on Conflict Research.

References